The former Dallas Public Library, now known as Old Dallas Central Library, is a multi-level civic structure located at 1954 Commerce Street in  downtown Dallas, Texas (USA). It is located on the edge of the Farmers Market District and adjacent to Main Street Garden Park. It is a contributing property in the Dallas Downtown Historic District and the Harwood Street Historic District and, along with the adjacent Dallas Statler Hilton, represents the best block of mid-twentieth-century architecture in Dallas. It was part of Dallas Public Library.

History
The Dallas Public Library was designed by noted architect George Dahl as the replacement for the 1901 Carnegie Library located on the same site. While Carnegie Library was being razed and the new library constructed, the Dallas Public Library moved their collections to Union Station temporarily.

The library opened in September 1955 capable of holding 800,000 volumes but only containing 300,000 books. It contained  on 4 above ground levels and 2 below ground levels, with provisions for 2 additional floors in the future. The auditorium in the second basement seated 250 people and a terrace allowed for a rooftop garden.

The Dallas Public Library moved their collection to the larger J. Erik Jonsson Central Library upon completion of that building in 1982. The building was sold to an investment company which also owns the adjacent Dallas Statler Hilton, but the building has remained vacant since the library's departure.

In December 2017 The Dallas Morning News relocated its headquarters to the building after a lengthy redevelopment. The newspaper's increased focus on creating digital content and relocation of the printing presses from the former Young Street headquarters were cited as reasons for the transfer.

Controversial artwork
From the beginning, the new library building's artwork caused controversy. Harry Bertoia was commissioned to design a metal screen to hang above the circulation desk. When his $8,500 abstract "Textured Screen" was unveiled in 1955, Dallas Mayor R.L. Thornton called it “a bunch of junk painted up,” and a “cheap welding job.” Outrage over the sculpture grew so much that architect George Dahl purchased the artwork himself and moved it to his private home, where it remained until wealthy and embarrassed citizens donated money for the sculpture. It was reinstalled in time for the library's opening, and now resides inside the J. Erik Jonsson Central Library.

Symbolizing "the hands of God supporting youth reaching for learning through the medium of literature," the $12,000 relief sculpture depicted two hands lifting a boy wearing blue jeans. The library planned to take the sculpture with them to the new building, but it remained on the empty building for several years. In 1993 the sculpture was sold and now resides at the Marshall M. Fredericks Sculpture Museum at Saginaw Valley State University.

Gallery

See also

National Register of Historic Places listings in Dallas County, Texas
List of Dallas Landmarks

References

External links

Historical Narrative
"Youth in the Hands of God" sculpture

Libraries in Dallas
Buildings and structures in Dallas
Modernist architecture in Texas
Government buildings completed in 1955
Library buildings completed in 1955
1955 establishments in Texas